SS6 may refer to:
 SS-6 Sapwood, the world's first intercontinental ballistic missile
 Signaling System No. 6
 , a submarine of the United States Navy
 Super Show 6, the sixth international tour by South Korean boy band Super Junior
 China Railways SS6, a Zhuzhou-built electric locomotive